(born November 3, 1949) is a Japanese classical oboist and conductor.

Career
Miyamoto started his oboe lesson at Toho Gakuen High School with Seizo Suzuki, and began his worldwide career at the age of 18, when he moved to Germany to study with Helmut Winschermann.

He played in the municipal symphony orchestra in Essen,  the Frankfurt Radio Symphony, and then WDR Symphony Orchestra Cologne; he was the first Japanese oboist to hold first chair in Europe. He continued to live there until the year 2000, in which he returned to Japan. He has released several albums, not only in classical but
also in pop fields like jazz, film music.

Miyamoto is a professor of the Tokyo College of Music. He has announced his retirement as a professional oboist and performed his last concert at the end of March 2007 and now active as a conductor. His second daughter is also a well known Violinist, Emiri Miyamoto.

References

External links
Official Page of Miyamoto Fumiaki

Japanese classical oboists
Living people
1949 births
Male oboists
20th-century Japanese musicians
20th-century classical musicians
21st-century Japanese musicians
21st-century classical musicians
20th-century Japanese male musicians
21st-century Japanese male musicians